Shelly Bay is a bay on the Miramar Peninsula of Wellington, New Zealand.

The area was settled by a collection of peoples from multiple Māori iwi in the 1820s and 1830s. It was later bought by the New Zealand Company, in a sale the Crown apologised for in 2008, admitting that the deed was flawed and promises were never kept.

Most of the land was owned by the New Zealand Defence Force for 124 years until 2009. During that time it was used as a submarine mining base, a naval station, and an airforce base, and land was reclaimed.

Today, Shelly Bay is the site of a planned residential development that is the subject of multiple ongoing court cases and other opposition. Opponents of the development include the Mayor of Wellington Andy Foster, film-maker Peter Jackson, some businesses and some Māori. In November 2020, the Wellington City Council agreed to sell and lease land to the development, against the wishes of mayor Foster. The bay was occupied by Mau Whenua, a Māori group opposing the development, from November 2020 through to May 2022.

Geography 
Shelly Bay is a small bay in the larger Evans Bay on the west of the Miramar Peninsula, north of its isthmus, and is about 8 km by road from Wellington's city centre. The land at the bay is part of the Wellington suburb of Maupuia and includes some reclaimed land, with nearby hillsides excavated to provide fill.

According to the head of Victoria University of Wellington's Geography, Environment and Earth Sciences department, the land at Shelly Bay is at risk from coastal flooding due to sea level rises. In 2019, he predicted within forty years, damage previously seen once every 100 years would occur once every three or four years. He considered that a sea wall was feasible but that protecting the road around the coast would be problematic.

According to Land Information New Zealand, the name "Shelly Bay" became official in July 2020; LINZ does not provide the origin of the name.

History

Māori history and European land purchase 
In the 1820s and 1830s, a collection of peoples from multiple Māori iwi (tribes), including Te Āti Awa, Taranaki, Ngāti Ruanui, and Ngāti Tama, migrated to the region. This group became known as Taranaki Whānui ki te Upoko o te Ika. The village sited at the northern end of the bay was named Maru-Kai-Kuru.

In 1839 the bay was bought by the New Zealand Company along with most of Wellington. The deed of purchase would later be described as "seriously" flawed. It was in English only and had no map to define boundaries.

Defence Installations

Coastal mining 
By the 1880s, Shelly Bay was under the private ownership of Coutts Crawford. In 1886, the Crown requisitioned the land for defence purposes under the Public Works Act, and in the following years, became the site for an anti-submarine mine depot. This was a part of the major build-up of New Zealand's coastal defences during the late Victorian era, due to hostilities and fears of a Russian naval attack. By 1895, coastal defences in Wellington extended over the whole of the northern area of Watts Peninsula from Scorching Bay to Shelly Bay. Their task was to maintain harbour defence mines to fend off potential attacking Russian Navy ships if they arrived through the inlet towards the city. The installation was operated by the Wellington Submarine Mining Volunteers.

In 1891, the base was the site of an explosion, killing one man. An inquest was held, with its jury concluding that the accident occurred through the "accidental explosion of gun-cotton", but there was not sufficient direct evidence to determine what caused the explosion. A memorial plaque for Sapper Penfold, Sergeant Wilson, Corporal Bramley and Lance Corporal Palmes, of the Wellington Submarine Mining Volunteers, is located in Old St Paul's, Wellington.

Navy base 

In 1907, the base was transferred to the Royal Navy, which constructed a new wharf along with munitions stores and an aerial tramway into the side of Mount Crawford, with limited use during The Great War.

During World War II, the base saw significant expansion, with an expanded wharf, further ammunition stores and a new slipway. In addition, new accommodation, workshops and a small hospital were constructed on land reclaimed from the harbour. The buildings had a combined floor space of 69,050 square feet. The wharf totaled 37,200 square feet and had 1,200 feet of berthing space. Four Fairmile coastal patrol boats were based in Wellington, with the base being used as a primary repair and maintenance location for them. Following the creation of the Royal New Zealand Navy in 1941, ownership of the base was transferred, with the base receiving the name HMNZS Cook.

Air Force base 
In 1946 ownership of the base was transferred to the Royal New Zealand Air Force, and renamed Shelly Bay Air Force Base. The airforce base closed in 1995 and the New Zealand Defence Force put the land up for disposal. A naval museum was on the site but this was shut in 2008.

Treaty of Waitangi settlement 
In 2003, the Waitangi Tribunal ruled that iwi were owed compensation over Shelly Bay. On 14 February 2009 4.5 hectares of land was handed over to the iwi Taranaki Whānui ki te Upoko o te Ika (also shortened to Taranaki Whānui) who bought the land as part of a $25 million Treaty of Waitangi settlement. The settlement related to wrongdoings in and arising from the 1839 land purchase. The Crown apologised over this sale, saying the deed was flawed and promises were never kept. The Crown failed to set aside one-tenth of the land for Māori as required by the terms, took land for public purposes without compensation, and locked up remaining Māori land in perpetual leases. The settlement included the right to buy the Shelly Bay property (as well as several other around Wellington) and the iwi chose to do so at a cost of at least $13.3 million.

Current use and wildlife 
Buildings previously part of the defence bases have had little or no maintenance since the base ceased operations. The wharf itself has almost rotted away. A number of artists rent studio spaces in the area. The area also features the Chocolate Fish cafe; former mayor Kerry Prendergast described the cafe as "iconic" and it became renowned after actors and crew from the Lord of the Rings trilogy frequented it. It also has a campsite.

Some of the 2005 film King Kong was filmed in Shelly Bay, including construction of the giant wall that separates Kong from the rest of Skull Island. Shelly Bay is a short drive from the Miramar studios used for filming the movie.

Little blue penguins (kororā) live in the bay, with some nesting underneath the buildings. Te Papa staff have estimated that about half of the penguins in the region use the harbour mouth alongside Mirimar peninsula during their breeding cycle.

Development of the area 

Multiple uses for the land of Shelly Bay have been proposed since the closure of the defence base, including a casino, an indoor rainforest biome, and a movie museum, the latter being proposed by director Peter Jackson. Development of the area has been controversial; news site Stuff reported that it wrote about 400 articles on Shelly Bay between 2011 and 2019.

Ian Cassels, director of the property development company The Wellington Company, has been planning a $500 million development for the land since 2014 but the project has faced legal, bureaucratic, and other barriers.

Resource consent 
A resource consent is required for the proposed development. A consent was first granted by Wellington City Council in 2017, but it was legally challenged by the lobby group Enterprise Miramar. A 2018 Court of Appeal decision quashed that resource consent, saying that the Council wrongly interpreted law when it decided to grant it. Following the court decision, there was a reconsideration of the consent process, conducted by independent commissioners, which was completed in October 2019. These commissioners approved a new resource consent. This consent allows for more intensive housing than Wellington's district plan would ordinarily allow. Enterprise Miramar continues to oppose the resource consent.

Sale of iwi-owned land and objections from Māori groups 
To develop the area, Cassels has purchased land from the Taranaki Whānui iwi. Much of the land, which was officially owned by an entity called Port Nicholson Block Settlement Trust (PNBST), was sold in June 2017 for $2 million, less than the iwi had paid for it. Sale of all the land had initially been voted on, and members of the Taranaki Whānui iwi voted against the sale, but the sale of a portion of the land was a smaller matter and did not require a vote. Mau Whenua, a group of Taranaki Whānui members, said the sale neither had the will nor mandate of iwi members and pledged to get the land back. PNBST said in a newsletter that it had to make the deal to survive as it was cash-strapped.

A deal to sell the remaining land for $10 million was made by PNBST, also in 2019. Mau Whenua members obtained a caveat on a sale in July 2019, which prevents a sale unless it is withdrawn, removed by the High Court, or expires. However, PNBST had already made the deal to sell the land prior to the caveat, and Cassels stated he was confident he could get the High Court to remove the caveat. Opponents of the sale say there was no discussion of the sale before the deal was made. The caveat lapsed in December 2019 and the currently listed owner of this parcel of land is a company owned by Cassels and his partner.

In December 2019 PNBST announced by a newsletter to Taranaki Whānui members that it was aiming to become involved again in the Shelly Bay development. The newsletter stated that PNBST was in talks with Cassels' company to buy land at Shelly Bay from the company.

In November 2020, Mau Whenua began an occupation of Shelly Bay, putting up tents. Mayor Andy Foster, who opposes the development, showed up to help erect tents. Several councillors said that it was disgraceful for the mayor to support opposition to a council decision, though Foster said he thought he was attending a "community gathering". In January 2021, the developers sent a cease-and-desist letter to try to remove the protestor, but the occupation continued. In November 2021, Taranaki Whānui served the occupiers with an eviction notice; other groups calling for an end to the occupation include two local marae. The occupation ended in May 2022.

Proposed sale of Council-owned land 
The proposed development would also require Wellington City Council to sell and lease some land to the developers. Councillors had voted in favour of the sales and leases in September 2017 and granted Council chief executive the power to do so, but after the issues with the resource consent and disputes over whether councillors had all the correct information, the chief executive Kieth Lavery refused to make the transaction and indicated in 2019 that the matter would likely go to a new vote.

The Shelly Bay sale became an election issue in the October 2019 Wellington local elections, and most candidates had a position on the development. Prior to the election most councillors supported the development, but after the election, it was reported that most councillors opposed it. The mayoral election at the same time also saw Wellington mayor Justin Lester, who supported the proposal, replaced by Andy Foster, who as a councillor opposed it for several years and whose election campaign centered on stopping the development.

In a vote of November 2020, Wellington City councillors voted 9–6 in favour of the proposal to sell 0.3 hectares of council land and lease another 0.6 hectares. Mayor Foster called the decision "sad".

Other objections 

The development has seen opposition from other parties. Director Peter Jackson opposes the development, describing it as a "precious green space" threatened by "Soviet-era apartments". He has threatened legal action over the issue.

The lobby group Enterprise Miramar cite concerns such as traffic safety and congestion in their opposition. Mayor Andy Foster has said that the council needs to investigate road capacity and safety associated with the project. Wellington City Council has previously voted to cap its share of infrastructure for the development at $10m. A December 2020 article reported that the council had already spent over $800,000 on legal fees and consultants over the development issue.

Possible central Government support 
In 2020 the central Government announced a $3 billion infrastructure fund to restart New Zealand's economy following the coronavirus pandemic. Ian Cassels has applied to the fund, saying the Shelly Bay project is "shovel-ready", while lawyers for Fran Walsh and Peter Jackson have implored Government ministers to reject the application.

References

Suburbs of Wellington City
Royal New Zealand Air Force bases
Taranaki Whānui ki te Upoko o te Ika